Services Hospital, located on Jail Road, Lahore, in Punjab, Pakistan, is the teaching hospital for the Services Institute of Medical Sciences (SIMS).

Recognized institution 
It is recognized by the Pakistan Medical Commission for its undergraduate program as well as by the College of Physicians and Surgeons Pakistan for its postgraduate training.

History

Initially established in 1958, Services Hospital started as an outdoor mini hospital for government employees, as a satellite clinic of Mayo Hospital. The hospital had 60 beds to provide basic health facilities. In 1960, it was named Wahdat  Hospital, and was subsequently renamed to Services Hospital. The hospital has expanded considerably and has been transformed since then. This started when it was declared a teaching hospital attached to Allama Iqbal Medical College (AIMC) in 1977. In 1995, the hospital became the teaching hospital for Gulab Devi Postgraduate Medical Institute. Later in 1999, it was declared as an autonomous medical institute, with a management board to oversee affairs and give policy guidelines. In 2002, the Services Hospital was declared as the teaching hospital for the then newly formed Services Institute of Medical Sciences.

Today, its 1,196 beds are located in 31 departments, with 27 major and 8 minor operation theaters and an out-patient attendance of 700 patients on average per day. Fiscal constraints have led the hospital's leadership to seek out alternative ways of funding, including philanthropic support. The hospital's aging infrastructure remains severely overstretched, resulting in electrical overload and fire accidents.

School of Nursing at Services Hospital Lahore
The School of Nursing is situated next to the hospital and has an educated teaching staff. It takes on students every year for a three-year training program leading to a degree in nursing.

This school is supervised by Pakistan Nursing Council. The PNC (established in 1948) is an autonomous, regulatory body that licenses Nurses, Midwives, Lady Health Visitors (LHVs), and Nursing Auxiliaries to practice in Pakistan.

Dealing with corona pandemic
Many working doctors, nurses and paramedical staff members were diagnosed with 'Covid-19 positive' leading to temporary shortage of hospital staff at the Services Hospital in March 2021.

Gallery

References

External links
Services Institute of Medical Sciences

Hospital buildings completed in 1985
Hospitals in Lahore
Teaching hospitals in Pakistan
Hospitals established in 1958
1958 establishments in Pakistan